Pia Nilsson (born 8 May 1958) is a Swedish professional golfer and coach. She was one of the two players, who were the first female Swedes to play collegiate golf at a University in the United States and the first Swede to captain a European Solheim Cup team.

Early years
Born in Malmö, Nilsson began playing golf at around 10 years of age, with her family at Torekov Golf Club in another part of Scania in southern Sweden, when they spend their summers there. At 14 years of age, her handicap had gone down to 10.

In her golf career, she later also came to represent Ystad Golf Club, Jönköping Golf Club, Ljunghusen Golf Club and Lidingö Golf Club.

Amateur career
Nilsson first represented Sweden at the European Lady Junior's Team Championship in 1975 and continued to do so five years in a row. In 1978, at Is Molas Golf Club, Sardinia, Italy, Sweden won the championship for the first time ever.

In 1976, at 18 years of age, Nilsson reached the semi-finals of the Swedish Match-play Championship and finished second at the Swedish International Stroke-play Championship. At the last-mentioned tournament, she was also part of winning the Swedish Team Championship with Ljunghusen Golf Club.

Her achievements in 1976, earned her a place, as one of the three best female amateurs in the country, in the Swedish team at the Espirito Santo Trophy.

In 1977, Nilsson beat her Swedish compatriot Charlotte Montgomery in a play-off for the title at en international amateur tournament in Torreon, Mexico.

In 1979, Nilsson won the Swedish Junior Stroke-play Championship at Sollentuna Golf Club outside Stockholm.

She appeared in the 1980 Espirito Santo Trophy at the Pinehurst Resort in Pinehurst, North Carolina, United States, were the Swedish team finished 7th and Nilsson 10th individually as best Swedish player.

She played her collegiate golf at Arizona State University, graduating with a Bachelor of Science in Physical Education in 1981 having made All-Conference Second Team in 1980–1981. Together with Charlotte Montgomery, Nilsson was the first female Swede to play collegiate golf at a University in the United States.

In March 1981, Nilsson represented Sweden, together with Charlotte Montgomery, at the international World Cup team competition for two-women national teams in Cali, Colombia. Sweden won as a team, 7 strokes ahead of Spain.

She was a member of the winning Swedish team at the 1981 European Ladies' Team Championship at Troia Golf Club, Portugal. It was Sweden's first victory ever in this championship.

Professional career
After being ill at the previous attempt in Houston, Texas, six months earlier, Nilsson qualified for the U.S.-based LPGA Tour at her third attempt, when she succeeded through the LPGA Tour Qualifying School at Bent Tree, Sarasota, Florida, in December 1982, finishing 3rd among 153 players competing for 15 available spots.

She played on the LPGA Tour from 1983 to 1987 with moderate success. Her best finish was tied 11th at the 1984 Konica San Jose Classic held at the Almaden Golf & Country Club in San Jose, California, six strokes behind winner Amy Alcott. Nilsson ended  the 1984 season 84th on the LPGA Tour money ranking.

She also played in Europe, winning her first professional tournament on the Swedish Golf Tour, at the time named the Telia Tour, at the 1986 SI Trygg-Hansa Open. She had seven other Swedish Golf Tour wins 1986–1990, including the 1989 Swedish Matchplay Championship, which since 1984 was open for professionals to enter.

She became head coach for the Swedish National Women's Teams (juniors, amateurs and pros) in Sweden from 1990 to 1995 and Head Coach for the Swedish National Teams (men and women; pros, amateurs and juniors) from 1996 to 1998.

By captain Mickey Walker, Nilsson was appointed assistant captain of the 1996 European Solheim Cup team. Two years later, as the first ever Swede, she was captain of the European team in 1998  Solheim Cup at Muirfield Village, Ohio, United States, were the U.S. team defeated the European team by 16–12. Six of the twelve players in the European team, and four of the five captain picks, were Swedish born.

She was co-founder with Lynn Marriott and head coach of Vision54 Golf Academy in Phoenix, Arizona, United States and co-author of books "Every Shot Must Have a Purpose" and "The Game Before the Game."

She coached a number of LPGA Tour professionals including being coach and mentor to Annika Sörenstam.

Personal life
She lives in Scottsdale, Arizona, United States, with a summer house in Torekov, Sweden and is a member of Talking Stick Golf Club, Scottsdale, Arizona and Torekov Golf Club, Sweden.

She was a member of the board of the PGA of Sweden 1989–1993 and became an Honorary member of the PGA of Sweden in 1999 and of the LPGA Teaching and Club Professionals in 2000.

Amateur wins
1977 International tournament (Torreon, Mexico)
1979 Swedish Junior Stroke-play Championship
1981 World Cup (Cali, Colombia) (team with Charlotte Montgomery)

Professional wins

Swedish Golf Tour wins (8)
1986 (2) Hooks Pro-Am, SI Trygg-Hansa Open
1987 (1) IBM Ladies Open
1988 (1) Ängsö Ladies Open 
1989 (3) Stora Lundby Ladies Open, Swedish Match-play Championship, Grundig Team Trophy (with Hillewi Hagström)
1990 (1) Grundig Team Trophy (with Hillewi Hagström)

Team appearances
Amateur
European Lady Junior's Team Championship (representing Sweden): 1975, 1976, 1977, 1978 (winners), 1979
Espirito Santo Trophy (representing Sweden): 1976, 1980
European Ladies' Team Championship (representing Sweden): 1977, 1981 (winners)
World Cup (Cali, Colombia): 1981 (winners)

Professional
Solheim Cup (representing Europe): 1998 (non-playing captain)

Awards and honors

1982 Elite Sign No. 68 by the Swedish Golf Federation, on the basis of national team appearances and national championship performances
1993 Swedish PGA Merit Sign in Gold
1994 Swedish Female Sports Coach of the Year
1995 Swedish Sports Coach of the Year
1995 Swedish Golf Federation Golden Club for contributions to Swedish golf
1998 King of Sweden Medal of the 8th dimension with a Royal Blue Ribbon for leadership in sports
1999 Golf Digest Japan Golf Coach of the Year
2001 National Golf Coaches Hall of Fame
2010 Golf Digest #1 ranked Women Teacher in America
2017 Erik Runfelt medal
PGA's of Europe Five-Star Professional award

References

External links

Swedish female golfers
Arizona State Sun Devils women's golfers
LPGA Tour golfers
Ladies European Tour golfers
Sportspeople from Malmö
People from Båstad Municipality
Golfers from Scottsdale, Arizona
1958 births
Living people